Srirat Chimrak (born 19 March 1972) is a Thai sprinter. She competed in the women's 4 × 400 metres relay at the 1992 Summer Olympics.

References

1972 births
Living people
Athletes (track and field) at the 1992 Summer Olympics
Srirat Chimrak
Srirat Chimrak
Place of birth missing (living people)
Olympic female sprinters